The Victoria and Albert Mountains are a mountain range running on the east coast of Ellesmere Island, Nunavut, Canada. The range is one of the most northern ranges in the world and of the Arctic Cordillera.

See also
List of mountain ranges

External links
 Peakbagger.com: Victoria and Albert Mountains

Mountain ranges of Qikiqtaaluk Region
Arctic Cordillera